Blyth Bridge is a small hamlet in the Scottish Borders area of Scotland, near to West Linton.

It is located in a bend on the A701 which goes from Moffat to Edinburgh, close to the junction with the East-West road the A72 which goes to Peebles.

Places nearby include the Lyne Water, Carlops, Romannobridge, and the Deepsyke Forest.

There is an aqueduct carrying a large water main which supplies Edinburgh and passes over Tarth Water.

There are a number of iron age forts on the hills nearby, and the historic Drochil Castle is a short distance away.

See also
List of places in the Scottish Borders
List of places in Scotland

References

External links

 RCAHMS: Blyth Bridge, Blyth Mill
PDF document from Scottish Borders Council
Gazetteer for Scotland: Blyth Bridge
 Blythbank Action Group
 Newlands Community Development Trust

Peeblesshire
Villages in the Scottish Borders